Apitua is a genus of sea snails, marine gastropod mollusks in the family Mangeliidae.

Species
Species within the genus Apitua include:
 Apitua delicatula Laseron, 1954

References

 Laseron, C.F. 1954. The New South Wales Turridae. Royal Zoological Society NSW. Zool. Handbook 56 pp.

External links
 Bouchet, P.; Kantor, Y. I.; Sysoev, A.; Puillandre, N. (2011). A new operational classification of the Conoidea. Journal of Molluscan Studies. 77, 273-308
  Tucker, J.K. 2004 Catalog of recent and fossil turrids (Mollusca: Gastropoda). Zootaxa 682:1-1295.
 Worldwide Mollusk Data base : Mangeliidae

 
Gastropod genera